, Arunachal Pradesh comprised 26 districts, with more districts proposed. Most of the districts are inhabited by various tribal groups. The latest and presently valid official map of districts of Arunachal Pradesh, after the most recent new districts were last announced on 30 August 2018, is in the external links.

History

When control of the North-East Frontier Agency was transferred to the Ministry of Home Affairs in September 1965 its five divisions, Kameng, Subansiri, Siang, Lohit and Tirap each became districts. Over the next few years many new districts were created out of the original five:

 On 13 May 1980 Subansiri district was bifurcated into two districts: Lower Subansiri district and Upper Subansiri district. Upper Subansiri district comprised the area occupied by the erstwhile Daporijo sub-division and Lower Subansiri district comprised the rest of the area occupied by the erstwhile Subansiri district.

 On 1 June 1980, 
 The erstwhile Lohit district was divided into two districts: Lohit district and Dibang Valley district. 
 Siang district was bifurcated into two districts: East Siang district and West Siang district. 
 Seppa and Bomdila sub-divisions of the Kameng district were transformed into East Kameng district and West Kameng district, respectively.

 On 6 October 1984, Tawang district was separated from East Kameng district.

 In 1987, the erstwhile Tirap district was divided into two districts: Tirap district and Changlang district.

 On 22 September 1992, the erstwhile Lower Subansiri district was again bifurcated into Lower Subansiri district and Papum Pare district.

 On 23 November 1994, Upper Siang district was split from East Siang district.

 On 1 April 2001, Kurung Kumey district was carved out from the erstwhile Lower Subansiri district.

 On 16 December 2001, Dibang Valley district was bifurcated into Dibang Valley district and Lower Dibang Valley district.

 On 16 February 2004, Anjaw district was carved out from the erstwhile Lohit district.

 On 19 March 2012, Longding district was carved out from the erstwhile Tirap district.

 On 25 November 2014, Namsai district was carved out from the erstwhile Lohit district.

 On 7 February 2015, Kra Daadi district was carved out from the erstwhile Kurung Kumey district.

 On 27 November 2015, a new Siang district was carved out from parts of East Siang and West Siang districts.

 On 22 September 2017, Lower Siang district, was carved out of West Siang and East Siang districts.

 On 4 December 2017, a new district called Kamle district was created from Lower Subansiri District and Upper Subansiri District, with its headquarters to be located in Raga. It comprises the administrative circles of Raga (which will be the district HQ), Kumporijo and Dollungmukh circles from Lower Subansiri District. The administrative circles taken from Upper Subansiri District will be Gepen Circle, Puchigeko Circle, Daporijo Sadar which falls under 25 Raga Constituency including Ligu and Liruk demarcation from Sigen Subansiri confluence in Single Administrative Unit.

On 30 August 2018, following 3 new districts were formed: 
 Pakke-Kesang carved out of East Kameng district with five administrative units namely Pakke-Kessang, Seijosa, Pijiriang, Passa Valley and Dissingn Passo with district headquarters at Lemmi. 
 Lepa-Rada created by bifurcating the Lower Siang district with headquarters at Basar and 4 administrative units namely Tirbin, Basar, Daring and Sago. 
 Shi-Yomi created by bifurcating the West Siang district with its headquarters at Tato and 4 administrative units namely Mechuka, Tato, Pidi and Manigong.

Administrative set-up

The districts of Arunachal Pradesh state are administrative geographical units, each headed by a deputy commissioner, an officer belonging to the Indian Administrative Service and a superintendent of police, an officer belonging to the Indian Police Service.

List of districts is as follows:

Proposals for new districts

 A proposal to bifurcate the existing Papum Pare district:
 the proposed Sagalee district entailing the existing sub-divisions of Sagalee, Leporiang, Parang, and Mengio.
 A proposal to create a new "North Subansiri district" from the northernmost Indo-China border subdivisions of the existing 3 districts, namely Kurung Kumey district, Kra Daadi district and Upper Subansiri district. The proposed "North Subansiri district" will entail the subdivisions of Sarli and Damin from the "Kurung Kumey district"; the subdivisions of Pipsorang and Longding Koling from the "Kra Daadi district"; and  the subdivisions of Taksing, Limeking, Nacho and Siyum  from the "Upper Subansiri district".
 A proposal to create a new "Hayuliang district" from the easternmost Indo-China border subdivisions of the existing 2 districts, namely Anjaw district and Lohit District. The proposed "Hayuliang district" will entail the northeasternmost parts of the existing Tezu circle of the "Lohit district"; and the existing subdivisions of Hayuliang, Metengliang, Chaglagam and Goiliang of the "Anjaw district".
 A 2017 proposal to bifurcate the existing Changlang district to create an additional "Rima district" out of it with HQ at Miao. The proposed "Rima district" will entail the existing subdivisions of Diyun, Bordumsa, Kharsang, Jairampur, Nampong, Rima-Putak (Tikhak), Miao, and Vijoynagar from the "Changlang district". However, it was unanimously opposed by the Changlang People's Forum in the same month.

References

External linkes 

 Official map of districts of Arunachal Pradesh, this is latest and currently valid map after the most recently new districts were last announced on 30 August 2018.

Districts
Arunachal Pradesh